Kings Will Be Tyrants by Ward Hawkins is a 1959 novel about fighting in Cuba. Bernardo Manuel Patrick O'Brien is a former U.S. Marine who winds up fighting for Castro. Though a Marine, he has to deal with the conflict of his heritage, both Cuban and American.

Military fiction
1959 American novels
American war novels
Novels about race and ethnicity
Novels set in the Cuban Revolution